Artarmon railway station is located on the North Shore line, serving the Sydney suburb of Artarmon. It is served by Sydney Trains T1 North Shore line services.

History
A temporary Artarmon station opened on 6 July 1898, before the present station opened on 7 October 1900. In April 2015, work commenced on the construction of a new footbridge that will include lifts at the northern end of the platform.

Platforms and services

Transport links
Artarmon station is served by two NightRide routes:
N90: Hornsby station to Town Hall station
N91:  to

References

External links

Artarmon station details Transport for New South Wales

Easy Access railway stations in Sydney
Railway stations in Sydney
Railway stations in Australia opened in 1900
Artarmon, New South Wales
North Shore railway line